Lekythoporidae is a family of bryozoans belonging to the order Cheilostomatida.

Genera:
 Aulopocella Maplestone, 1903
 Catadysis Canu & Bassler, 1927
 Harpagozoon Gordon, 2009
 Jugescharellina Gordon, 1989
 Lekythopora MacGillivray, 1883
 Orthoporidra Canu & Bassler, 1927
 Poecilopora MacGillivray, 1886
 Terataulopocella Rosso, 2002
 Turritigera Busk, 1884

References

Cheilostomatida